A referendum on judicial reform was held in Puerto Rico on 8 November 1960. The changes were approved by 78.4% of voters.

Results

References

1960 referendums
1960
1960 in Puerto Rico
Reform in Puerto Rico
November 1960 events in North America